William Oliver Bright (August 13, 1928 – October 15, 2006) was an American linguist and toponymist who specialized in Native American and South Asian languages and descriptive linguistics.

Biography 
Bright earned a bachelor's degree in linguistics in 1949 and a doctorate in the same field in 1955, both from the University of California, Berkeley. He was a professor of linguistics and anthropology at UCLA from 1959 to 1988.  He then moved to the University of Colorado at Boulder, where he remained on the faculty until his death.

Bright was an authority on the native languages and cultures of California, and was especially known for his work on Karuk, a Native American language from northwestern California. His study of the language was the first carried out under the auspices of the Survey of California and Other Indian Languages.  He was made an honorary member of the Karuk tribe—the first outsider to be so honored—in recognition of his efforts to document and preserve their language which led to its revival.  Bright was also known for his research on the Native American languages Nahuatl, Kaqchikel, Luiseño, Ute, Wishram, and Yurok, and the South Asian languages Lushai, Kannada, Tamil, and Tulu.  Of particular note are his toponymic contributions to knowledge about Native American place-names and their linguistic importance for tribes and California bands.

Bright was editor of Language, the journal of the Linguistic Society of America, from 1966 to 1988 and of Language in Society from 1993 to 1999. He was the founding editor of Written Language and Literacy, which he edited from 1997 until 2003. He served as president of the Linguistic Society of America in 1989.

Personal life 
Bright was the father of author Susie Bright. From 1986, he was married to fellow linguist Lise Menn. He died of a brain tumor.

Bibliography
Native American Placenames of the United States (University of Oklahoma, 2004)
1,500 California Place Names: Their Origin and Meaning (University of California, 1998) 
The World's Writing Systems (co-editor with Peter T. Daniels) (Oxford University Press, 1996)
A Coyote Reader (University of California, 1993)
International Encyclopedia of Linguistics (editor) (Oxford University Press, 1992)
Language variation in South Asia (Oxford University Press, 1990)
American Indian Linguistics and Literature (Mouton, 1984) 
Discovered tongues: Poems by linguists (editor) (Corvine Press, 1983)
Haiku journey: To the North Coast (Copper Canyon Press, 1983)
Bibliography of the languages of Native California, including closely related languages of adjacent areas (Scarecrow Press, 1982)

References

External links
Bill Bright, 1928-2006 at Language Log
The William O. Bright Papers at the American Philosophical Society

1928 births
2006 deaths
Linguists from the United States
Sociolinguists
American Mesoamericanists
Linguists of Mesoamerican languages
University of Colorado faculty
University of California, Los Angeles faculty
UC Berkeley College of Letters and Science alumni
People from Oxnard, California
Deaths from brain cancer in the United States
20th-century Mesoamericanists
Native American language revitalization
Toponymists
Linguists of Salishan languages
Linguists of Hokan languages
Linguists of Uto-Aztecan languages
Paleolinguists
Linguistic Society of America presidents